Kortebaanschaatsen (short track skating) refers to an old form of Dutch ice skating tournament that goes back to the 18th century. It is not to be confused with the modern speed skating sport known as short track speed skating. The sport is similar to harness racing (known as kortebaandraverijen) and is similarly setup in two straight lanes of 160 meters.

History
Since 1805 women's kortebaanschaatsen is held over a distance of 140 meters. In the first race held for women in 1805 in Leeuwarden won by Trijntje Pieters Westra, the women were "just as fast as the horses", which referred to a previous kortebaandraverij that had been held previously that week with sleighs instead of wheeled sulkys. The full list of women participants with their ages and addresses was published in an account by Evert Maaskamp. The women's sport was popular because the women were skating with bare arms and were seen to be unusually talented and strong. A print was made that became popular, that was accompanied by another engraving with a commemorative descriptive text.

The first Dutch national champions were for men Thijs Klompmaker (1926) and for women Sjoukje Bouma (1933).

Competitions
Dutch National Kortebaan Speed Skating Championships

Modern kortebaanschaatsen

Today most large Dutch cities have indoor skating rinks, and the rise of speed skating as a sport has enabled many young skaters to learn early how to skate through turns, which was never necessary on kortebaan tracks. With shorter and shorter periods of frost, fewer and fewer kortebaan sprint tournaments were held, which caused the creation of the indoor sprint alternative now known as KNSB Dutch Super Sprint Championships.

Skaters

Women

 Trijntje Pieters Westra (1783-1861)
 Houkje Gerrits Bouma (1788-1857)
 Trijntje Reidinga (1799-1869)
 Anke Beenen (1853-1886)
 Jeltje van der Werf (1852-1934)
 Ynskje Wagenaar (born 1868)
 Lutske Wester (1870-1912)
 Gelske Venema-Brouwe (1876–1957)
 Joukje Postma (born 1877)
 Sytske Spijkstra (born 1877)
 Baukje de Boer-Veenstra (born 1881-1969)
 Geertje Engelsma (1887-1969)
 Martha Hemminga (1900-1968)
 Jitske sietzes-de Boer (born 1906-1977)
 Loltje Tolman-de Boer (born 1910)
 Tietje Spannenburg-Pagels (born 1906)
 Janna van der Meulen (1907–1981)
 Annie de Jong-Zondervan (1907-1972)
 Klaasje Hofstee (born 1909)
 Houkje van der Meer (born 1910)
 Trijntje Terpstra (born 1910)
 Geesje Woudstra (1911-1971)
 Sjoukje Bouma (1911-2008)
 Trijntje Hemminga (1914-1994)
 Griet Bijlsma (born 1915)
 Hennie Sietsema
 Annie Heersema
 Sietske Pasveer (1915-2001)
 Makke Groen (1917-1977)
 Antje Koopmans
 Pietje Feitsma (1918-1933)
 Durkje Huitema (1918–2010)
 Meta Nienhuis
 Fokje van der Velde (1918-2008)
 Lien van der Mei
 Ike Nienhuis (1921-2001)
 Annie Pijlman (1925-2013)
 Coba Hoekstra (born 1925)
 Joke Hoekstra
 Tjitske Hartoog-Minkema (1926–1990)
 Jantje Bosscha
 Rina Kooi
 Elske van Dam
 Annie van der Meer (1928-2004)
 Dirkje Kiers (born 1929)
 Saakje de Jong (born 1929)
 Lucie Koops
 Zwaantje Mulder
 Antje Sietema
 Sietske de Boer
 Geertje Brouwer
 Grietje Dieterman-Schuur
 Tine de Vries (1931–2014)
 Sita Homan-Wagemaker (1931–2015)
 Trijntje Jelsma
 Jeltje Haanstra
 Afke Stoker (born 1932)
 Akke de Boer
 Tine Huberts
 Jantje Hagenou-Bathoorn
 Riekje Tuinema-Ruben (born 1933)
 Henny Wiegersma-van den Brug (c. 1934-1988)
 Femmy Groen (born 1935)
 Martha Wieringa (1935-2008)
 Jantje Tienkamp (born 1936)
 Gooitske de Jong
 Antje Hoekstra (born 1938)
 Dinie Kussendrager (born 1939)
 Atje Keulen-Deelstra
 Ieuwkje Hoekstra
 Lutske Hiddinga
 Marijke Flisijn (1943–2007)
 Grietje Boelm (born 1944)
 Grietje Oosterhof
 Rinske Zeinstra
 Willy Burgmeyer
 Annie van Dalsen
 Truus Dijkstra
 Anneke Zeinstra
 Margriet Pomper
 Sophie Westenbroek (born 1948)
 Grietje van der Meer (born 1949)

Men
 Jouke Schaap (1846-1923)
 Pieter Peereboom (1893–1941)

References

Ice skating events
Speed skating in the Netherlands
History of sport in the Netherlands